Poland participated in the Eurovision Song Contest 2015 with the song "In the Name of Love" written by Kuba Raczyński and Monika Kuszyńska. The song was performed by Monika Kuszyńska. In March 2015, the Polish broadcaster Telewizja Polska (TVP) announced that the Polish entry for the 2015 contest in Vienna, Austria would be selected through an internal selection. Kuszyńska and the song "In the Name of Love" were announced as the Polish entry on 9 March 2015 during the TVP1 programme Świat się kręci.

Poland was drawn to compete in the second semi-final of the Eurovision Song Contest which took place on 21 May 2015. Performing as the closing entry during the show in position 17, "In the Name of Love" was announced among the top 10 entries of the second semi-final and therefore qualified to compete in the final on 23 May. It was later revealed that Poland placed eighth out of the 17 participating countries in the semi-final with 57 points. In the final, Poland performed in position 18 and placed twenty-third out of the 27 participating countries, scoring 10 points.

Background 

Prior to the 2015 contest, Poland had participated in the Eurovision Song Contest seventeen times since its first entry in 1994. Poland's highest placement in the contest, to this point, has been second place, which the nation achieved with its debut entry in 1994 with the song "To nie ja!" performed by Edyta Górniak. Poland has only, thus far, reached the top ten on one other occasion, when Ich Troje performing the song "Keine Grenzen – Żadnych granic" finished seventh in 2003. Between 2005 and 2011, Poland failed to qualify from the semi-final round six out of seven years with only their 2008 entry, "For Life" performed by Isis Gee, managing to take the nation to the final during that period. After once again failing to qualify to the final in 2011, the country withdrew from the contest during 2012 and 2013. Poland returned to the contest in 2014 and managed to qualify to the final with their entry "My Słowianie - We Are Slavic" performed by Donatan and Cleo.

The Polish national broadcaster, Telewizja Polska (TVP), broadcasts the event within Poland and organises the selection process for the nation's entry. TVP confirmed Poland's participation in the 2015 Eurovision Song Contest on 10 October 2014. Between 2006 and 2011, TVP organised televised national finals that featured a competition among several artists and songs in order to select the Polish entry for the Eurovision Song Contest. After returning to the contest in 2014 following their two-year absence, the broadcaster opted to internally select the 2014 entry, a selection procedure that continued for their 2015 entry.

Before Eurovision

Internal selection 
The Polish entry for the 2015 Eurovision Song Contest was selected via an internal selection in collaboration with OGAE Poland. Among the artists that submitted an entry to TVP for consideration included Edyta Górniak, who represented Poland in the Eurovision Song Contest in 1994. TVP announced in March 2015 that the Polish entry would be presented in on 9 March 2015 during the TVP1 programme Świat się kręci, hosted by Agata Młynarska and Maciej Kurzajewski.

During the broadcast of Świat się kręci, it was announced that Monika Kuszyńska would represent Poland with the song "In the Name of Love", written by Kuszyńska herself together with her husband Kuba Raczyński. The song was also presented to the public the same day via the release of the official music video, directed by Roman Przylipiak. Kuszyńska was previously the lead singer of the group Varius Manx, which previously attempted to represent Poland at the Eurovision Song Contest in 2003 with the song "Sonny", until she experienced a car accident in 2006 which left her partially paralysed. A Polish language version of the song, titled "Obudź się i Żyj", was also recorded and released following the announcement.

Promotion 
Monika Kuszyńska made several appearances across Europe to specifically promote "In the Name of Love" as the Polish Eurovision entry. On 17 April, Kuszyńska performed during the Eurovision PreParty Riga, which was organised by OGAE Latvia and held at the Palladium Concert Hall in Riga. On 18 April, Kuszyńska performed during the Eurovision in Concert event which was held at the Melkweg venue in Amsterdam, Netherlands and hosted by Cornald Maas and Edsilia Rombley. In addition to her international appearances, Monika Kuszyńska also completed promotional activities in Poland where she performed "In the Name of Love" during a joint TVP press conference with Austrian broadcaster ORF in Kraków on 16 April.

At Eurovision 

According to Eurovision rules, all nations with the exceptions of the host country and the "Big Five" (France, Germany, Italy, Spain and the United Kingdom) are required to qualify from one of two semi-finals in order to compete for the final; the top ten countries from each semi-final progress to the final. In the 2015 contest, Australia also competed directly in the final as an invited guest nation. The European Broadcasting Union (EBU) split up the competing countries into five different pots based on voting patterns from previous contests, with countries with favourable voting histories put into the same pot. On 26 January 2015, a special allocation draw was held which placed each country into one of the two semi-finals, as well as which half of the show they would perform in. Poland was placed into the second semi-final, to be held on 21 May 2015, and was scheduled to perform in the second half of the show.

Once all the competing songs for the 2015 contest had been released, the running order for the semi-finals was decided by the shows' producers rather than through another draw, so that similar songs were not placed next to each other. Poland was set to perform last in position 17, following the entry from Slovenia.

All three shows were broadcast in Poland on TVP1 and TVP Polonia with commentary by Artur Orzech. The three shows were also aired on a one-day delay on the channels TVP Rozrywka and TVP HD. The Polish spokesperson, who announced the Polish votes during the final, was Ola Ciupa.

Semi-final

Monika Kuszyńska took part in technical rehearsals on 14 and 16 May, followed by dress rehearsals on 20 and 21 May. This included the jury final where professional juries of each country, responsible for 50 percent of each country's vote, watched and voted on the competing entries.

The stage show featured Monika Kuszyńska seated in a wheelchair wearing a white dress with long trains flanked by three backing vocalists on one side and a pianist on the other side. Purple and pink were the dominant colours of the stage lighting with the background LED screens displaying blossoming trees and waving white veils. An additional feature of the performance included the use of the screens on each side of the stage to display black and white images from Monika's past. The three backing vocalists that joined Kuszyńska were Ola Tabiszewska, Jan Radwan and Natalia Bajak, while the pianist was Kuba Raczyński.

At the end of the show, Poland was announced as having finished in the top ten and subsequently qualifying for the grand final. It was later revealed that the Poland placed eighth in the semi-final, receiving a total of 57 points.

Final
Shortly after the second semi-final, a winner's press conference was held for the ten qualifying countries. As part of this press conference, the qualifying artists took part in a draw to determine which half of the grand final they would subsequently participate in. This draw was done in the order the countries were announced during the semi-final. Poland was drawn to compete in the second half. Following this draw, the shows' producers decided upon the running order of the final, as they had done for the semi-finals. Poland was subsequently placed to perform in position 18, following the entry from Germany and before the entry from Latvia.

Monika Kuszyńska once again took part in dress rehearsals on 22 and 23 May before the final, including the jury final where the professional juries cast their final votes before the live show. Kuszyńska performed a repeat of her semi-final performance during the final on 23 May. At the conclusion of the voting, Poland placed twenty-third with 10 points.

Voting
Voting during the three shows consisted of 50 percent public televoting and 50 percent from a jury deliberation. Each nation's jury consisted of five music industry professionals who are citizens of the country they represent, with their names published before the contest to ensure transparency. This jury judged each entry based on: vocal capacity; the stage performance; the song's composition and originality; and the overall impression by the act. In addition, no member of a national jury was permitted to be related in any way to any of the competing acts in such a way that they cannot vote impartially and independently. The individual rankings of each jury member were released shortly after the grand final.

Below is a breakdown of points awarded to Poland and awarded by Poland in the second semi-final and grand final of the contest, and the breakdown of the jury voting and televoting conducted during the two shows:

Points awarded to Poland

Points awarded by Poland

Detailed voting results
The following members comprised the Polish jury:
  (jury chairperson)journalist
 journalist
 Witold Czamara (Donatan)music producer, represented Poland in the 2014 contest
 journalist
 Natalia Szroedersinger, musician

References 

2015
Countries in the Eurovision Song Contest 2015
Eurovision
Eurovision